Flinch is a 2021 American crime thriller film written, directed, and produced by Cameron Van Hoy. The film stars Daniel Zovatto, Tilda Cobham-Hervey, Cathy Moriarty, Buddy Duress, and Tom Segura.

Plot
The film tells the story of a young hitman who falls for a girl who witnesses him commit a murder. Unable to bring himself to dispose of her, he takes her home and quickly learns that there is more to her than meets the eye.

Cast 
 Daniel Zovatto as Joe Doyle
 Tilda Cobham-Hervey as Mia
 Tom Segura as Ed Terzian
 Cathy Moriarty as Gloria Doyle
 Buddy Duress as James Vaughn
 David Proval as Lee Vaughn
 Steven Bauer as Joseph Doyle
 Michael Drayer as Connor

Release 
The film had a limited theatrical release on January 15, 2021. It went on to be released digitally in February of the same year on Prime Video, Google Play, and iTunes. It was also released on DVD and VHS on the same date.

Reception 
The film holds a 50% approval rating on Rotten Tomatoes from 8 critics.

References

External links
 

2021 films
2021 crime thriller films
American crime thriller films
2020s English-language films
2020s American films